Running on Empty is a 2006 German drama film directed by Bülent Akinci. It was entered into the 28th Moscow International Film Festival where Jens Harzer won the award for Best Actor.

Plot summary

Cast
 Jens Harzer as Burkhard Wagner
 Marina Galic as Carolin Wagner
 Anna Maria Mühe as Heike
 Christian Blümel as Charlie
 Mehdi Nebbou as Rachid
 Tom Jahn as Walter Rösler

References

External links
 
 

2006 films
2006 drama films
Films scored by Wim Mertens
German drama films
2000s German-language films
2000s German films